Tour Hekla is a 220-meter (722 ft), 48-story skyscraper currently under construction in Puteaux, in the La Défense district of Paris, in France. It was designed by French architect Jean Nouvel. The building received its building permit in June 2016. Construction began in May 2018 for a delivery scheduled for early 2022. When completed, it will be the second-tallest building in France, only surpassed in height by the Tour First, the tallest tower in the La Défense district. The cost of the project is estimated to be 248 million euros.

References

External links
Official website

Skyscrapers in France
Buildings and structures under construction in France
La Défense